The 2010 Nova Scotia Men's Molson Provincial Championship was held February 3–7 at the Mayflower Curling Club in the Halifax Regional Municipality. The winning team, skipped by Ian Fitzner-LeBlanc represented Nova Scotia at the 2010 Tim Hortons Brier, also in Halifax.

Teams

Draw Brackets

A Event

B Event

C Event

Playoffs

A vs. B
February 6

C1 vs. C2
February 6

Semifinal
February 7

Final
February 7

External links
Official site

Nova Scotia Men's Molson Provincial Championship
Curling competitions in Halifax, Nova Scotia
2010 in Nova Scotia